This article presents a list of the historical events and publications of Australian literature during 1870.

Books 

 James Lester Burke — The Adventures of Martin Cash
 Marcus Clarke — For the Term of His Natural Life
 B. L. Farjeon — Joshua Marvel
 J. R. Houlding 
 The Farm, the City and the Sea
 Rural and City Life, or, The Fortunes of the Stubble Family

Short stories 

 Marcus Clarke — "Squatters of the Past and Present : 'Arcades Ambo'"
 B. L. Farjeon — "In Australian Wilds"
 Mary Fortune
 "The Hart Murder"
 "My Lodger"
 "The Spider and the Fly"

Poetry 

 Mary Hannay Foott — "Ave Caesar! Te Morituri Salutant!"
 Adam Lindsay Gordon
 Bush Ballads and Galloping Rhymes
 "The Sick Stockrider"
 "Thora's Song"
 Henry Kendall
 "Bush Lyrics : No. II : Camped by the Creek"
 "The Late A. L. Gordon : In Memoriam"
 Francis MacNamara — "The Ballad of Martin Cash"

Essays 

 Henry Kendall — "The Holy Grail"

Births 

A list, ordered by date of birth (and, if the date is either unspecified or repeated, ordered alphabetically by surname) of births in 1870 of Australian literary figures, authors of written works or literature-related individuals follows, including year of death.

 3 January — Henry Handel Richardson, novelist (died 1946)
 24 January — Ethel Turner, novelist (died 1958)
 5 June — Jeannie Gunn, novelist (died 1961)
 18 September — Jane Fletcher, poet, nature writer and children's writer (died 1956)
 10 October — Louise Mack, poet and WWI war correspondent (died 1935)
 1 November — Christopher Brennan, poet (died 1932)
 25 December – S. Elliott Napier, poet (died 1940)

Deaths 

A list, ordered by date of death (and, if the date is either unspecified or repeated, ordered alphabetically by surname) of deaths in 1870 of Australian literary figures, authors of written works or literature-related individuals follows, including year of birth.

 24 June — Adam Lindsay Gordon, poet (born 1833)

See also 
 1870 in Australia
 1870 in literature
 1870 in poetry
 List of years in Australian literature
 List of years in literature

References

 
Australia
19th-century Australian literature
Australian literature by year